Abu-Asida Muhammad II also known as Abû `Asida Muhammad al-Muntasir Billah, (1279–1309) was the Hafsid dynasty caliph of Tunis. 
He was the posthumous son of Yahya II al-Wathiq and successor of Abu Hafs Umar bin Yahya.  He reigned from 1295 to September 1309.

Life 
During his reign a treaty was signed with the Republic of Venice in 1305 and with James II of Aragon in1301 and 1308.

During his reign there was an attempt to end the schism with the western branch of the Hafsids. Abu-Zakariyya, ruler of Bejaia died in 1301 and was succeeded by his son Abu-l-Baqa Khalid An-Nasr.  This prince approached Abu-Assida and concluded an agreement with him that whichever died first was to be succeeded by the other with whom he finally reached an agreement; a treaty was signed by which the first to die would be succeeded by the other.  He died in 1309 and according to this agreement his nephew Abu-l-Baqā Khalid was to be proclaimed emir, but instead a son of Abu Faris bin Ibrahim I, named Abu Yahya Abu Bakr I al-Shahid was proclaimed by the Almohad sheikhs of Tunis.

References

1279 births
1309 deaths
14th-century Hafsid caliphs
13th-century Hafsid caliphs